Syracuse most commonly refers to:

 Syracuse, Sicily
 Syracuse, New York

Syracuse may also refer to:

Places in the United States
Syracuse, Indiana
Syracuse, Kansas
Syracuse, Missouri
Syracuse, Nebraska
Syracuse, Ohio
Syracuse, Utah

Other
Syracuse (satellite), a series of French military communications satellites
Syracuse Mets, a minor league baseball club
Syracuse University, in Syracuse, New York 
Syracuse Orange, the collective identity for Syracuse University athletic teams

See also
 East Syracuse, New York
 North Syracuse, New York
 Province of Syracuse
 
 Siracusa (disambiguation)